Frederic Clemson Howe (November 21, 1867 – August 3, 1940) was a member of the Ohio Senate, a Georgist (advocate of a single tax), Commissioner of Immigration of the Port of New York, and published author. He was also founder and president of the League of Small and Subject Nationalities.

Biography
He received a bachelor's degree from Allegheny College in 1889 and a Ph.D from Johns Hopkins University in 1892. In 1901, he was elected to Cleveland City Council, Ohio as a Republican. During his tenure, he became a key advisor to Tom L. Johnson, mayor of Cleveland at that time. He ran for reelection as an independent, but lost. In 1904, he married Marie Jenney. He studied law at Miami University in Ohio.

In 1905, he published "The City: the Hope of Democracy", which the Oxford English Dictionary cites as the first use of the term "big business".

In 1919, Howe was targeted during a bombing spree, but was unharmed.

On 27 July 1933, George N. Peek, head of the Agricultural Adjustment Administration, appointed Howe as the head of the Consumers' Counsel.  Howe was associated with other left-wing members of the Roosevelt administration.

Rexford Tugwell claimed that Howe was "the subject of vitriolic attacks by the business interests" and was "pictured as a Red". Chester R. Davis now decided to get rid of Howe. He later recalled: "Fred Howe was a man of high ideals and very practical sense. He was the 'turn the other cheek' type. He was a well-meaning man who permitted his organization to be loaded down with a group of people who were more concerned with stirring up discontent than they were with achieving the objectives of the act."

Howe is buried in Meadville, Pennsylvania.

References

Selected works

 (1896). Taxation and Taxes in the United States.
 (1897). The City of Cleveland in Relation to the Street Railway Question.
 (1905). The City: the Hope of Democracy. 
 (1906). The Confessions of a Monopolist. Chicago: The Public Publishing Company.
 (1907). The British City: The Beginnings of Democracy. 
 (1910). Privilege and Democracy in America.
 (1912). Wisconsin: An Experiment in Democracy.
 (1913). European Cities at Work.
 (1914). The Modern City and Its Problems.
 (1915). Socialized Germany.
 (1916). Why War. New York: Charles Scribner's Sons.
 (1917). The High Cost of Living.
 (1919). The Land and the Soldier.
 (1919). The Only Possible Peace.
 (1921). Denmark: a Cooperative Commonwealth.
 (1921). Revolution and Democracy.
 (1925). The Confessions of a Reformer.
Articles
 "The City as a Socializing Agency: The Physical Basis of the City: The City Plan." American Journal of Sociology, vol. 17, no. 5 (1912), pp. 590–601. .

Sources
 Breamner, Robert H. (1949). "The Civic Revival in Ohio: Honest Man's Story: Frederic C. Howe." American Journal of Economics and Sociology, vol. 8, no. 4, pp. 413–422. .
 Miller, Kenneth E. (2010). From Progressive to New Dealer: Frederic C. Howe and American Liberalism. Penn State University Press.
 Rippley, LaVern J. (1988). "Charles McCarthy and Frederic C. Howe: Their Imperial German Sources for the Wisconsin Idea in Progressive Politics." Monatshefte, vol. 80, no. 1, pp. 67–81.

External links
 
 Works by Frederic C. Howe, at JSTOR
 Works by Frederic C. Howe, at Hathi Trust
 Howe biography at Encyclopedia of Cleveland History
  "Frederic C. Howe: Making Cleveland the City Beautiful (Or At Least, Trying)"
 "The Sconset School of Opinion"

Ohio Republicans
Johns Hopkins University alumni
University of Maryland, College Park alumni
1867 births
1940 deaths
Georgist politicians